Kushuru (Ancash Quechua for an edible kind of seaweed, erroneously also spelled Cshuro)  is a mountain in the Andes of Peru which reaches an altitude of approximately . It is located in the Ancash Region, Bolognesi Province, Huasta District. Kushuru lies south of the Pampa Wayi valley.

References 

Mountains of Peru
Mountains of Ancash Region